St Augustine's and Our Lady of Good Counsel College (Coláiste na Dea Comhairle), New Ross, known as "Good Counsel College" by its students and residents of the local area, is an all-boys secondary school in County Wexford, Ireland, which caters for over 850 students. It was founded and is now conducted by the Irish Augustinians. It is one of only two secondary schools in Ireland under the order of the Augustinians, with the other being in Dungarvan, Co. Waterford. It is the largest school in New Ross. The current principal is Mark O Brien, who assumed the post in 2013, after the principal Fr. John Hennebry O.S.A. took the position of Provincial of the Order of Saint Augustine.

Patron saint
The College is named in honour of the 4th-century saint Augustine of Hippo, a philosopher and theologian whose writings were very influential in the doctrinal development of Western Christianity.

Other English-speaking Augustinian schools with the same patron include one in Richland, New Jersey and one in San Diego, California – both in the United States; Colegio San Agustin-Bacolod, Colegio San Agustin, Biñan and Colegio San Agustin, Makati in the Philippines; a school in Malta, another Irish one in Dungarvan, and one in Sydney, Australia.

History

Since it was established in its present form in 1256, the Augustinian Order throughout the world has viewed involvement in education as an important part of its apostolate. Beginning in the 1790s, the Augustinians made various attempts to establish colleges in New Ross, but due to adverse political and economic circumstances their efforts met with a limited degree of success until 1890, when Good Counsel College was established. From 1890 until 1980, the old Good Counsel College stood in the heart of New Ross. It was a small boarding school which catered for students from all parts of Ireland.

With the educational revolution in the 1960s, the scene changed dramatically. Student numbers increased greatly, the great majority of them being local day-students. A greatly expanded curriculum placed increasing demands on the existing facilities. Accordingly, a new college was constructed on the outskirts of the town and opened its doors as the new "Counsel" in 1984. Since then the college has grown further with the addition of a technology block (Villanova), a new classroom block (Cascia), and a large sports hall with gymnasium named after the past rector of the college, Fr. John Cosgrave, O.S.A.. More recently, four floodlit astro turf pitches have been added. Catering today for over 850 boys, Good Counsel College continues to provide an education in the Augustinian tradition.

Facilities
Facilities include a refectory, assembly hall, sports centre including an indoor sports hall and gymnasium, learning support centre, technology block, first year block and various playing fields including three GAA pitches, two rugby pitches, a soccer pitch and four astroturf pitches. There are two basketball/tennis courts behind the sports hall.

The APEX Gym & Swimming Pool is located on the grounds of Good Counsel College.

Former students

Notable former students include: 
 Ger Aylward, hurler
 Ben Brosnan, Wexford football captain and businessman 
 Pádraic Delaney, actor
 Dermot Desmond, businessman and financier
 Kevin Doyle, former professional footballer 
 Tadhg Furlong, Ireland and Leinster rugby player
 Aidan O'Brien, racehorse trainer 
 Matthew O'Hanlon, Wexford hurling captain 
 John Paul Phelan, Fine Gael TD
 Maverick Sabre, recording artist 
 Walter Walsh (hurler), Kilkenny hurler

Sport
In 1999 the school secured the Senior Colleges A Football Championship and won the Hogan Cup, the premier trophy for colleges' Gaelic football.

Sources
Thomas C. Butler, O.S.A., "Near Restful Waters – The Augustinians in New Ross and Clonmines". (Dublin & Kildare, 1975). Mob

External links
 International Order of St. Augustine
  Text of the Rule of St. Augustine
 Catholic Encyclopedia entry for the "Hermits of St Augustine"
 Order of the Hermit Friars of St. Augustine (O.S.A.)
 Official Good Counsel website

Boys' schools in the Republic of Ireland
Catholic secondary schools in the Republic of Ireland
Augustinian schools
Secondary schools in County Wexford
New Ross
1890 establishments in Ireland
Educational institutions established in 1890